Acanthonotozomellidae is a family of amphipod crustaceans. A new species was discovered deep in Drake Passage in 2001, with small teeth covering its body. As of 2022, four genera and eight species are currently recognized.

Genera

Acanthonotozomella
Acanthonotozomoides
Actinacanthus
Amatiguakius

References

Gammaridea
Crustacean families